Ashland may refer to:

Places

Canada
Ashland, New Brunswick

United Kingdom
Simpson and Ashland, Milton Keynes, Buckinghamshire

United States

Historic sites
Ashland (Henry Clay estate), a historic site in Lexington, Kentucky, and the source of the name of several other Ashlands
Ashland (Upper Marlboro, Maryland), listed on the National Register of Historic Places (NRHP) in Maryland
Ashland Plantation in Darrow, Louisiana
Ashland (Ashland, North Carolina), listed on the NRHP in North Carolina
Ashland (Henderson, North Carolina), listed on the NRHP in North Carolina

Communities
Ashland, Alabama
Ashland, California
Ashland, Georgia
Ashland, Illinois
Ashland, Indiana
Ashland, Kansas
Ashland, Kentucky
Clay, Kentucky, founded as Ashland
Ashland, Concordia Parish, Louisiana
Ashland, Natchitoches Parish, Louisiana
Ashland, Maine, a New England town
Ashland (CDP), Maine, the main village in the town
Ashland, Massachusetts
Ashland, Mississippi
Ashland, Missouri
Ashland, Montana
Ashland, Nebraska
Ashland, New Hampshire, a New England town
Ashland (CDP), New Hampshire, the main village in the town
Ashland, New Jersey
Ashland, Chemung County, New York
Ashland, Greene County, New York
Ashland, Ohio
Ashland, Oklahoma
Ashland, Oregon
Ashland, Pennsylvania
Ashland, Tennessee
Ashland, Virginia
Ashland, West Virginia
Ashland, Wisconsin, a city
Ashland (town), Wisconsin, a town

Other places with Ashland in its name
Ashland City, Tennessee
Ashland County, Ohio
Ashland County, Wisconsin
Ashland Heights, South Dakota
Ashland Junction, Wisconsin, an unincorporated community
Ashland Township, Morgan County, Indiana
Ashland Township, Michigan
Ashland Township, Dodge County, Minnesota
Ashland Township, Clarion County, Pennsylvania

Ships
USS Ashland (LSD-1), launched 1942
USS Ashland (LSD-48), launched 1989
City of Ashland (shipwreck), launched 1883, shipwrecked 1887

Train stations
Ashland station (CTA Green and Pink Lines), Chicago
Ashland station (CTA Orange Line), Chicago
Ashland/63rd station, Chicago
Ashland Avenue station, Chicago
Ashland station (MBTA), Ashland, Massachusetts
Ashland station (PATCO), Voorhees, New Jersey
Ashland station (Virginia), an Amtrak station in Virginia
Ashland Transportation Center, an intermodal transit station in Kentucky
Ashland station (Soo Line), a former station in Wisconsin
Ashland Union Station, a former station in Wisconsin

Other uses
Ashland Airport (disambiguation), several instances
Ashland Brewing Company, a historic Wisconsin brewery
Ashland Bridge (disambiguation), several instances
Ashland Daily Tidings, a newspaper
Ashland Daily Press, a newspaper
Ashland High School (disambiguation), several instances
Ashland Inc., formerly known as Ashland Oil (named for Ashland, Kentucky)
Marathon Ashland Petroleum, LLC, former name of Marathon Petroleum
Ashland Railway
Ashland University in Ashland, Ohio
Clay-Ashland, Liberia, a township named after Henry Clay and his estate.
Waking Ashland, a piano rock band whose name was inspired by Ashland, Oregon